Donna Vekić was the defending champion, but chose not to participate this year.

Caroline Wozniacki won the title, defeating Alexandra Dulgheru in the final, 4–6, 6–2, 6–1.

Seeds

Draw

Finals

Top half

Bottom half

Qualifying

Seeds

Qualifiers

Draw

First qualifier

Second qualifier

Third qualifier

Fourth qualifier

Fifth qualifier

Sixth qualifier

References
Main Draw
Qualifying Draw

Malaysian Open
Malaysian Open (tennis)